Government Law College, Thiruvananthapuram also known as GLC Trivandrum is one of the institutions imparting graduate and post graduate legal education in India. Affiliated to the University of Kerala, it is the second law college in Kerala and one of the oldest law colleges in India. It was established in 1875 by the then Maharajah of the erstwhile Princely State of Travancore. Notable alumni of the college including Judges of Supreme Court of India such as Justice Fathima Beevi, judges of High Courts, politicians, and academicians such as N. R. Madhava Menon.

History

The government of His Highness Maharaja of Travancore on 31 January 1875 sanctioned "the Organisation of a Law Class in connection with His Highness College at Thiruvananthapuram to enable candidates from Travancore to present themselves for the Law Examination of the University of Madras and to encourage others to pursue the study of Law systematically". The order sanctioning the scheme directed that it shall be worked on the same lines as the Class attached to the Presidency College at Madras. Mr. W. E. Ormsby, Barrister-at-law, then a Judge of Sadur Court of Travancore was appointed Professor of Law in His Highness the Maharajas College. He opened the class on 9 February of the same year. In 1877, His Highness College was affiliated to the University of Madras in the Faculty of Law.

The class was thus continued till 1894 when in conformity with important alterations in the by-laws of the Madras University regarding the B.L. Degree Examination, the institution was re-organised on an entirely different footing. The Law Class which till then was working as a part of His Highness College and the Professors whereof were treated as members of that College was raised to the status of an independent College under the designation of "His Highness Maharaja's Law College, Thiruvananthapuram". A complete set of rules was also sanctioned by the Government for the control and regulation of work in the college. The rules prescribed the qualification required for the members of the teaching staff.

The Law College was maintained by His Highness Government and the management of the college was vested in the Principal acting directly under the orders of Dewan of Travancore till the end of 1908. In 1909 the College was placed under the Director of Public Instruction and in 1910 it was placed under the control of the High Court. With the inauguration of University of Travancore in 1938, the College was transferred to the control and supervision of the University.

In August 1949 the college was shifted to Ernakulam to fit in with the new set up arising out of the integration of erstwhile State of Travancore- Cochin and the location of the High Court of the united State at Eranakulam. In 1954 it was again brought to Thiruvananthapuram, leaving at Ernakulam a sister college and was housed in the current premises in the Highland Bungalow on the Barton Hill. Under the University Act of 1957, the college was transferred to the control of Government of Kerala. In 1961 Government made the Thiruvananthapuram Law College a permanent institution.

In 1962-63 a full-time Post-graduate course was introduced with M. L. Degree and LL.M was started in 1971. Three Year LL.B course was started from 1967-68 & Five Year LL.B. Course was introduced from the academic year 1984-85.

Campus
The Government Law College Thiruvananthapuram is housed in the Highland Bungalow of Mr. Barton, British Chief Engineer of erstwhile Princely State of Travancore. Many new blocks were later added in the 5 acre beautiful green campus in the heart of the city.

Academics

Admissions
Admissions to both undergraduate and post graduate programs at the Government Law College Thiruvananthapuram are through a highly competitive entrance examination conducted by Commissioner for Entrance Examination, Government of Kerala.

Academic programmes 

B.A., LL.B (Integrated)

Government Law College Thiruvananthapuram offers an undergraduate five-year integrated LL.B. program which, upon completion, qualifies the student to sit for the bar to practice law in India.

This course is a double degree Integrated course comprising B.A (English) and LL.B degrees. The bachelor's degree in B.A. and Law shall consist of regular course of study for a minimum period of 10 Semesters in Five Years and shall consist of 14 papers in B.A. and 31 papers in Law.

LL.B (3 year Course)

Government Law College also offers a three-year LL.B. program which, upon completion, qualifies the student to sit for the bar to practice law in India.
The course of study for the bachelor's degree in Law (LL.B) shall consist of regular course of study for a minimum period of 6 semesters in three years and shall consist of 20 compulsory papers, 4 compulsory clinical papers and 6 optional papers in Law.

Masters in Law (LL.M)

Government Law College offers post graduate Law degrees in two lines of specialization: Constitution Law & Criminal Law. The normal duration of the LL.M. programme shall be four semesters. Government Law College Thiruvananthapuram was one of the few colleges to run a LL.M Programme in Constitution Law.

LL.M (Evening Batch)

Sanction accorded by Government of Kerala and orders issued to start a 20 student batch from 2015-16.

Library
Government Law College Thiruvananthapuram library is one of the oldest law library in the country. The spacious and magnificent College Library is an important resource center, primarily intended to provide undergraduate and postgraduate readers with the books they need for their studies. The Government Law College library is known for its rare collection of books and treatise on various subjects not limited to law. It holds over 27,000 books and 5000 periodicals. The library is fully automated, and book circulation is maintained through Library-cum-Identity Cards with the help of a barcode system.

Noted academician and alumnus Prof. (Dr.) N.R. Madhava Menon promised handing over his collection of books to the college library, during his speech at the 140 years celebration of the college in March 2015.

Research Block
Research Center in Law status has been accorded to Government Law College Thiruvananthapuram by the University of Kerala. The college has requested for the formation of a chair named Malloor Govinda Pillai Chair on Criminal Law . A proposal for formation of Justice K.K Mathew Chair on Constitutional Law is also pending with the government.

Prof. (Dr.) N.R. Madhava Menon announced in March 2015 that he would be available to guide the research programmes at the college.

Student life

Hostel
The Hostel Block inaugurated by the then President of India, Shri.Fakaruddin Ali Ahmed as a men's Hostel is now converted as a Women's Hostel. The admission is made by the Warden for students from second year of study onward. The male students are now accommodated in a separate block at University Hostel for Men at Palayam, Thiruvananthapuram.

Moot Court Competition
Government Law College Thiruvananthapuram hosts an annual national level moot court competition- All India Moot Court Competition for Justice V.R. Krishna Iyer Trophy.

Over the years, Government Law College Thiruvananthapuram team excelled in various national level moot court competitions. Including winning the XV All India Moot Court Competition 2012 for Adv. T. S. Venketeswara Iyer Memorial Ever Rolling Trophy conducted by Govt. Law College, Ernakulam Moot Court Society. Winning multiple best memorial awards and individual awards.

Quizzing
The Government Law College quizzing team is well known in the quizzing circuits of Kerala. They brought glory to University of Kerala by bagging the First Runner Up trophy in the 2013 National Youth Festival held at Kurukshetra in Haryana. The team also got First Prize in South Zone Inter-University Youth Festival held at Bangalore in 2013. 
The Quiz Club hosts quiz within the college from time to time.

National Service Scheme
The National Service Scheme is an Indian government-sponsored programme under the Department of Youth Affairs and Sports of the Government of India. Government Law College Thiruvananthapuram has two NSS Units. In 2012, Best Programme Officer of N.S.S. for University of Kerala was awarded to Assistant Professor K. Hareendran of Government Law College Thiruvananthapuram. The N.S.S. unit has been actively involved in many social service activities in rural area and has organised many legal aid and legal literacy programs in addition to forest conservation, environmental protection and blood donation camps

Student Publications
Government Law College Thiruvananthapuram magazine is brought out annually by the college union. The Student Editor is chosen by an electoral college consisting of all students of the college, and the Staff Editor is nominated by the Staff Council headed by the college Principal. Dr. N.R. Madava Menon was the student editor during 1954-55.

Internal Quality Assurance Cell (I.Q.A.C.) is soon coming out with a student edited in-house journal devised to escalate the quality and to upsurge the academic talents of the student community. The Student Law Journal is aimed for the promotion of reading, writing and research among students and act as a powerhouse in outsourcing the craft and in optimizing the quality of the student community.

Notable alumni

Judiciary
 Fathima Beevi, former judge, Supreme Court of India, first female Supreme Court judge & 11th Governor of Tamilnadu State
 K. K. Mathew, former judge, Supreme Court of India
 Cyriac Joseph, former judge, Supreme Court of India
 B. Kemal Pasha, Honorable Justice, High Court of Kerala
 P. Habeeb Mohamed, former judge, The High Court of Travancore (princely state)
 N. Anil Kumar, Judge high court of kerala
 Sathish Ninan, Judge High Court of Kerala
 P. Somarajan, Judge High Court of Kerala
 C. S. Dias, Judge High Court of Kerala
 Padmanabhan Subramanian Poti, Judge, High court of Gujarath
 T. V. Anilkumar, Judge High Court of Kerala
 Justice K. Babu, High court of Kerala
 P G Ajith Kumar, Honorable Justice,  High Court of Kerala

Legislature
 V. R. Krishnan Ezhuthachan, Member of Cochin Legislative Council
 A. Sampath, Former Member of Parliament
 V. D. Satheesan, Leader of Opposition, Second Vijayan Government 
 N.K. Premachandran, Member of Parliament
 Jose K. Mani, Member of Parliament
 M. I. Shanavas, Member of Parliament
 R. Sankara Narayanan Thampi, first speaker of Kerala Legislative Assembly
 K. M. Seethi, former speaker of Kerala Legislative Assembly
 Mathew Kuzhalnadan, member of Kerala Legislative Assembly
 N. Sakthan, former speaker of Kerala Legislative Assembly
 T.V. Rajesh, member of Kerala Legislative Assembly
 P. C. Vishnunath,Member of Kerala Legislative Assembly
 K. K. Ramachandran Nair, Former Member of Kerala Legislative Assembly
 P. Aisha Potty, Former Member of Kerala Legislative Assembly
 D. Damodaran Potti, former speaker of Kerala Legislative Assembly
 K. A. Damodara Menon, Freedom Fighter, Journalist and politician

Government
 C. Achutha Menon, former Chief minister of Kerala
 K.T. Achuthan, Former Minister for Transport & Labour, Pattom Ministry
 E. Ikkanda Warrier, 3rd Prime Minister of Cochin
 P. T. Chacko, Former Home Minister of Kerala
 Ramesh Chennithala, former Home Minister, Government of Kerala
 Thiruvanchoor Radhakrishnan, former Sports Minister, Government of Kerala
 K. C. Joseph (Irikkur politician), former minister of rural development & cultural affairs 
 M. Vijayakumar, former Minister of Law, Government of Kerala
 R. Sankar, former Chief minister of Kerala
 P. K. Vasudevan Nair, former Chief minister of Kerala
 C. Kesavan, former Chief minister of Travancore-Cochin (princely state)
 M. N. Govindan Nair, former minister, Government of Kerala
 T. M. Jacob, former minister, Government of Kerala
 Mathew T. Thomas, former minister, Government of Kerala
 G. Sudhakaran, former minister, Government of Kerala
 E. Ahamed, former Minister of State, External Affairs
 M. B. Rajesh, Minister for Excise Government of Kerala
 Kodikunnil Suresh, former Minister of State, Labour
 Mullappally Ramachandran, former Minister of State, Home Affairs

Bureaucrats

 N. R. Madhava Menon, former ISS officer, founder of National Law School of India University, N.U.J.S. and N.J.A

 V. Joseph Thomas former Indian police chief 
 Abdul Sathar Kunju (1963 Batch), Indian Police Service officer and Ex-Kerala Police Chief
 Malayattoor Ramakrishnan, former IAS officer and award-winning writer
 T P Sundararajan, Former officer in National Intelligence Bureau

Malayalam Film Industry

 Resul Pookutty, Oscar award winner
 Bheeman Raghu, actor and police officer
 Anoop Menon, actor, script writer
 Shankar Ramakrishnan, actor, script writer
 Karamana Janardanan Nair, Actor

Others

 K. M. Mathew, former Chief Editor, Malayala Manorama

 Aiyappan Pillai, Senior Lawyer in Bar Council of India, One of the First Councillor of Thiruvananthapuram Corporation.

 Joy Thomas, President Kerala Cooperation Consumer Federation Limited.

 K. C. Kesava Pillai, Poet Laureate of Travancore and was known for Kesaveeyam, a mahakavya in Malayalam, two attakathas and several bhajans and kirtans

Popular culture
Shaji Khailas directed and Ranji Panicker scripted, Suresh Gopi starring block buster film Thalasthanam revolves around the politics of Government Law College Thiruvananthapuram.

Shooting also took place in Government Law College for K. Madhu directed Jayaram starring movie Randam Varavu.

See also 
 Government Law College, Ernakulam
 Kerala Law Academy Law College, Thiruvananthapuram
 University of Kerala

References

External links
 

 
Law schools in Kerala
Colleges in Thiruvananthapuram
Colleges affiliated to the University of Kerala
Educational institutions established in 1875
1875 establishments in India
Academic institutions formerly affiliated with the University of Madras